Congregational Church of the Evangel is a historic Congregational church at 1950 Bedford Ave. in Flatbush, Brooklyn, New York, New York.  It was built in 1916-1917 and is an asymmetrically massed Late Gothic Revival style building.  It is constructed of gray-green random quarry faced ashlar with cast stone trim, a variegated slate roof, copper gutters, and stained and leaded glass windows. The building consists of a nave with steeply pitched gable roof, low sidewall with engaged buttresses, a gabled side porch, a square bell tower, and a small gabled office annex.  The chancel's elaborate furnishings and Tiffany glass windows were installed in 1927.

It was listed on the National Register of Historic Places in 2009.

References

External links
church website

Properties of religious function on the National Register of Historic Places in Brooklyn
Gothic Revival church buildings in New York City
Churches completed in 1917
20th-century United Church of Christ church buildings
Churches in Brooklyn
United Church of Christ churches in New York (state)